Jilong Road is a Shanghai Metro station located on Line 10 in Pudong, Shanghai, China. Located at North Fute Road and Jilong Road, within the Shanghai Waigaoqiao Free Trade Zone section of the Shanghai Free-Trade Zone, it serves as a terminus of Line 10, and opened as part of the second phase extension of the line into Pudong. The extension was expected to open in 2018, but due to construction delays, the station, along with the rest of the extension, opened on 26 December 2020. The station is the first Shanghai Metro station to be located within a free-trade zone in the country.

References 

Railway stations in Shanghai
Shanghai Metro stations in Pudong
Line 10, Shanghai Metro
Railway stations in China opened in 2020